Benedicto Kagimu Mugumba Kiwanuka (8 May 1922 – 22 September 1972) was the first prime minister of Uganda, a leader of the Democratic Party, and one of the persons that led the country in the transition between colonial British rule and independence. He was murdered by Idi Amin's regime in 1972.

Biography
A member of the Baganda ethnic group, Kiwanuka was born in Kisabwa to Kaketo-Namugera (father) and was a member of the Roman Catholic Church.

Following a law course in Lesotho in 1960–62, he travelled to London to study for the Bar at University College London. He was called to the Bar by Gray's Inn in February 1956.

As a result of the September 1961 Uganda Constitutional Conference held in London, Uganda achieved internal self-government on 1 March 1962. Kiwanuka became Uganda's first Chief Minister in the new National Assembly.

New elections, however, were held in April 1962, with Kiwanuka's party losing to the alliance of Milton Obote's Uganda People's Congress and the Buganda traditionalist party, Kabaka Yekka. In addition, Kiwanuka's Catholicism made him unpopular with his fellow Buganda, a mainly Protestant people. Uganda achieved independence on 9 October 1962, with Obote as the first prime minister of a fully independent Uganda.

Kiwanuka was imprisoned in 1969 by Obote's government, but was one of 55 political detainees released by Idi Amin immediately after the coup that brought Amin to power. Amin appointed him as chief justice of Uganda on 27 June 1971.

Kiwanuka soon came into confrontation with Amin's disregard for the rule of law. In the immediate aftermath of Obote's 1972 invasion of Uganda, Kiwanuka was arrested at gunpoint by Amin's men as he presided over a session of the High Court. As well as countermanding from the bench some of Amin's more draconian orders, Kiwanuka had also secretly agreed to support Obote's return to power, with the proviso that Kiwanuka would be involved in constitutional reform.

Kiwanuka was killed on 22 September at Makindye Military Prison. Western accounts described a prolonged execution which, according to eyewitnesses, involved Kiwanuka's ears, nose, lips, and arms being severed, a disembowelling, and castration before he was finally immolated. Other sources claimed that, rather than being tortured, Kiwanuka was personally shot by Amin. Kiwanuka's death was not acknowledged as an execution, with Amin instead publicly blaming it on Obote's supporters and even launching a police investigation. Kiwanuka's killing was the first of a series directed against leading figures in the Baganda and Ankole tribes, aimed at curbing their power.

Kiwanuka's grandson, Mathias Kiwanuka, played defensive end for Boston College's American football team, and was the New York Giants' first round pick in the 2006 NFL Draft, eventually winning two championships with the team.

In 2018, a monument was dedicated to him at the request of Ugandan president Yoweri Museveni.

References 

1922 births
1972 deaths
Alumni of University College London
Assassinated Ugandan politicians
British colonial army soldiers
Democratic Party (Uganda) politicians
Members of Gray's Inn
People murdered in Uganda
Prime Ministers of Uganda
Ugandan judges
Ugandan Roman Catholics
20th-century Ugandan lawyers
Chief justices of Uganda